A partial solar eclipse will occur on October 15, 2069. A solar eclipse occurs when the Moon passes between Earth and the Sun, thereby totally or partly obscuring the image of the Sun for a viewer on Earth. A partial solar eclipse occurs in the polar regions of the Earth when the center of the Moon's shadow misses the Earth.

Related eclipses

Solar eclipses 2069–2072

References

External links 

2069 10 15
2069 in science
2069 10 15
2069 10 15